Betty Kyallo is a Kenyan media personality and entrepreneur.

Early life and education 
Kyallo was born on 15 March 1989 in Kajiado county, Ongata Rongai. The second child in her family, she has two sisters (Mercy Kyallo and Gloria Kyallo) and one brother (Brian Kyallo). Her parents are Julia Ngii and Wilfred Kyallo. Her parents later separated but have been both present in most of her life milestones. She attended Olerai Primary School and Uhuru Gardens primary school; later she joined Kangundo Girls High School for her secondary education. She went to Daystar University where she graduated with a bachelor's degree in mass communication.

Career 
She joined Kenya Television Network where she worked as an intern, and was later taken in as a news anchor where she aired the 9 pm news on Fridays (the Friday Briefing). In the show, she could invite various guests and interview them. Later, she joined K24 where she aired the weekend 'Up close with Betty' program. She quit K24 and started her own salon and spa business in Kilimani named Flair by Betty. In mid-2021 she started another business, Aftershave by Flair barbershop and Bk closet. On June 17, 2022, Showmax introduced Kyallo Kulture, a new Kenyan reality series about Betty Kyallo and her sisters Mercy and Gloria.

Awards 
In 2017, SOMA awarded Betty Kyalo as the media personality of Kenya.

In 2018 she emerged as the winner of the K0T 2018 Awards.

In 2020 she won the TV/online influencer award, in the Africa Digital Influencer Awards (ADIA20) event.

Personal life 
She has one daughter by the name Ivanna.

In 2020 when COVID-19 pandemic hit, Kyallo together with her sister and players of Nairobi City Stars F.C were involved in a charity mission organised by the Jonathan Jackson Foundation. They gave out food and other necessities to families in need at Kibera.

References

Living people
Kenyan media personalities
21st-century Kenyan businesswomen
21st-century Kenyan businesspeople
1989 births